Ng Chee Meng  (born 8 August 1968) is a Singaporean politician, union leader and former lieutenant-general who has been serving as Secretary-General of the National Trades Union Congress since 2018. A member of the governing People's Action Party (PAP), he was the Member of Parliament (MP) representing the Punggol North division of Pasir Ris–Punggol GRC between 2015 and 2020. He served as Minister for Education (Schools) between 2015 and 2018, and Minister in the Prime Minister's Office between 2018 and 2020.

Prior to entering politics, Ng served in the Singapore Armed Forces (SAF) between 1986 and 2015 and held the appointments of Chief of Air Force between 2009 and 2013 and Chief of Defence Force between 2013 and 2015, holding the rank Lieutenant-General. 

He made his political debut in the 2015 general election as part of a five-member PAP team contesting in Pasir Ris–Punggol GRC and won. However, during the 2020 general election, he led a four-member PAP team contesting in Sengkang GRC and lost to the opposition Workers' Party team, which won 52.12% of the vote. Despite his electoral defeat, he was co-opted into the PAP's Central Executive Committee (CEC) in 2020 and remains indirectly active in politics.

Education
Ng was educated at The Chinese High School and Hwa Chong Junior College, and was awarded the Singapore Armed Forces Overseas Training Award (Graduating) in 1987. He completed a Bachelor of Science in electrical engineering at the United States Air Force Academy in 1991, and graduated from the Singapore Command and Staff College in 1999. In 2002, he obtained a Master of Arts in international relations from The Fletcher School of Law and Diplomacy at Tufts University.

Military career

Ng joined the Singapore Armed Forces (SAF) in December 1986 and was a fighter pilot in the Republic of Singapore Air Force. During his military career, among the appointments he held were the following: Commanding Officer, 144 Squadron; Commander, Changi Air Base; Deputy Head, Joint Communications and Information Systems Department; Head, Air Plans; Director, Joint Operations; Deputy Chief of Air Force. He was also the Military Private Secretary to the Minister of Defence from December 1995 to July 1996.

Ng succeeded his elder brother, Ng Chee Khern, as the Chief of Air Force on 10 December 2009. He relinquished this position to Hoo Cher Mou on 25 March 2013, and succeeded Neo Kian Hong as the Chief of Defence Force (CDF) on 27 March. He was promoted from the rank of Major-General to Lieutenant-General on 27 June 2013. Ng was the second air force general in Singapore's military history to be appointed as the CDF, after Bey Soo Khiang in 1995.

Ng chaired the organising committee for the state funeral of Singapore's first Prime Minister, Lee Kuan Yew, from 23 to 29 March 2015. He also led the first round of the vigil guard who stood guard during Lee's lying in state in Parliament House from 25 to 28 March.

Ng retired from the SAF on 18 August 2015 and was replaced by Perry Lim as the CDF.

Political career
Ng confirmed on 18 August 2015 after retiring from the SAF that he would enter politics. On 22 August, the PAP announced that Ng would be part of a six-member PAP team that would be contesting in Pasir Ris–Punggol Group Representation Constituency in the 2015 general election. The PAP team won, clinching 72.89% of the electorate's valid votes in the constituency. Ng was appointed Acting Minister of Education (Schools). Subsequently, Ng was the Second Minister for Transport and Minister of Education (Schools) from 1 November 2016 - 30 April 2018.

On 23 April 2018, Ng joined the National Trades Union Congress (NTUC) and was appointed as its Deputy Secretary-General. On 22 May 2018, Ng was elected by the NTUC Central Committee members to become Secretary-General of the NTUC.

On 29 June 2020, the media announced that Ng will lead the four-member PAP team contesting in the new Sengkang Group Representation Constituency in the 2020 Singaporean general election. On 30 June 2020 (Nomination Day), it was confirmed that Ng's PAP team will contest for Sengkang GRC against the Workers' Party team led by He Ting Ru. The newly created GRC has more than 120,000 eligible voters in GE2020.

On 10 July 2020, Ng's PAP team lost to the WP team by a margin of 4.26% and he lost his parliamentary seat. He retains his title as labour chief and secretary general of the NTUC.

On 19 November, he was co-opted into the central executive committee (CEC) of the PAP. His appointment into the CEC came as a surprise to local political observers as he had lost reelection. The party justified it on the grounds that his predecessors had been part of the committee and that omitting Ng would have been a "massive departure".

Personal life
Ng has an elder brother, Ng Chee Khern, a former major-general who served as Chief of Air Force between 2006 and 2009, and a younger brother, Ng Chee Peng, a former two-star rear-admiral who served as Chief of Navy between 2011 and 2014.

Awards and decorations
 Meritorious Service Medal (Military), in 2015
 Public Administration Medal (Military) (Gold), in 2011.
 Public Administration Medal (Military) (Bronze), in 2005.
 Long Service Medal (Military), in 2012.
 Singapore Armed Forces Long Service and Good Conduct (20 Years) Medal
 Singapore Armed Forces Long Service and Good Conduct (10 Years) Medal with 15 year clasp
 Singapore Armed Forces Good Service Medal
 Knight Grand Cross of the Most Noble Order of the Crown
 Bintang Swa Bhuwana Paksa Utama (1st Class)
 The Most Exalted Order of Paduka Keberanian Laila Terbilang (1st Class)
 Knight Grand Cross of the Most Exalted Order of the White Elephant
 Darjah Panglima Gagah Angkatan Tentera (1st Degree)
 Legion of Honour  (Commander)

References

External links

 Ng Chee Meng on Prime Minister's Office

1968 births
Living people
Members of the Parliament of Singapore
People's Action Party politicians
Chiefs of Defence Force (Singapore)
Chief of the Republic of Singapore Air Force
Singaporean people of Chinese descent
Singaporean people of Teochew descent
Hwa Chong Institution alumni
The Fletcher School at Tufts University alumni
United States Air Force Academy alumni
Ministers for Education of Singapore
Recipients of the Pingat Jasa Gemilang (Tentera)
Recipients of the Pingat Pentadbiran Awam (Tentera)
Recipients of the Long Service Medal (Military) (Singapore)